The following squads were named for the 1948 Summer Olympics tournament.

Afghanistan
Head coach:

Austria
Head coach: Eduard Frühwirth

China
Head coach: Lee Wei Tong

Denmark
Head coach:  Reg Mountford

Egypt
Head coach:  Eric Keen

France
Head coach:

Great Britain
Head coach: Matt Busby

India
Head coach: Balaidas Chatterjee

Ireland (Éire)
Head coach: Johnny Carey

Italy
Head coach: Vittorio Pozzo

South Korea
Head coach: Lee Young-min

Luxembourg
Head coach: Jean-Pierre Hoscheid

Mexico
Head coach: Abel Ramírez

Netherlands
Head coach:  Jesse Carver

Wim Landman, Sjaak Alberts, Jos Beenhakkers and Henk Temming were also part of the Dutch squad, but they did not play in any matches.

Sweden
Head coach:  George Raynor

Turkey
Head coach: Ulvi Yenal

United States
Head coach: Walter Giesler

Yugoslavia
Head coach: Milorad Arsenijević

References

External links
 FIFA
 RSSSF
 Yugoslavia squad at Serbian Olympic committee
 Great Britain team at British Olympic Association 
 Denmark squad at DBU 
 Sweden medalists at Swedish Olympic committee
 List of Luxembourgian olympic footballers at ALO
 List of Mexican olympic football players at the 1948 olympics.
 Match report at voetbalstats.nl
 Match report at voetbalstats.nl
 Turkey national football team: match reports 1947-1948, Walter Verani, Erdinç Sivritepe and Turkish Soccer
 China National Football Team

Squads
1948 Summer Olympics